Nancy Verónica Dupláa (born 3 December 1969) is an Argentine actress.

Biography
Nancy Verónica Dupláa was born on December 3, 1969 in Olivos, Buenos Aires Province, and was raised in San Martín, a suburb to the west. She is the sister of the radio host Enrique "Quique" Dupláa and the aunt of the actress María Dupláa. She enrolled in the University of Buenos Aires to pursue a degree in graphic design, but discontinued her studies after two years and then began the career of Maternal and Child Assistant.

Career
An apprenticeship in the local theatre led to her first significant role, that of Mariana, the teen protagonist in a popular local teen drama series, Montaña Rusa, in 1994–1995. 

She remained active in the theatre, working with veteran actor Federico Luppi in a local production of The Dresser, in 1997. She first appeared on the Argentine cinema in a thriller, Comodines, in 1997. 

She was reunited with Gastón Pauls for the acclaimed Nueces para el amor, in 2000. 

While at work in El desvío, she met her future husband, actor Pablo Echarri, with whom she co-starred in the hit romantic comedy, Apasionados, in 2002. 

She has won a Martin Fierro Award for best actress, for her work in the television series 099 Central.

Personal life
From 1994 to 1998, Nancy Dupláa was in a relationship with the actor Gastón Pauls, whom he met on the set of the TV show Montaña Rusa. 

From 1998 to 2000, Nancy Dupláa was in a relationship with the journalist and radio and television host, Matías Martin. On May 20, 2000 she gave birth to the couple's first child, a boy, whom they called Luca Martin.

On August 23, 2003, she gave birth to her second child and first child with Pablo Echarri, whom they called Morena Echarri Dupláa. On February 7, 2007 she married Pablo Echarri. On April 8, 2010, she gave birth to her third child and second child with her husband, whom they called Julián Echarri Dupláa.

Filmography

Television

Movies

Television Programs

Awards and nominations

References

External links

 
 

1969 births
Living people
Argentine film actresses
Argentine television personalities
Women television personalities
Argentine people of Lebanese descent
People from Vicente López Partido